The Stephen Condit House is a historic house located on Beverwyck Road in Parsippany, New Jersey. It was added to the National Register of Historic Places on February 15, 1974.

References

National Register of Historic Places in Morris County, New Jersey
Houses on the National Register of Historic Places in New Jersey
Victorian architecture in New Jersey
Houses completed in 1870
Parsippany-Troy Hills, New Jersey
Houses in Morris County, New Jersey
New Jersey Register of Historic Places